Ranzi is a surname. Notable people with the surname include:

Galatea Ranzi (born 1967), Italian actress
Gian Matteo Ranzi (born 1948), Italian lightweight wrestler 
Ubaldo Ranzi (born 1970), Italian decathlete and bobsledder

See also
Lanzi